Thomas Knapp may refer to:

Thomas L. Knapp, founder of the Boston Tea Party (political party)
Thomas Knapp (MP) for Bristol (UK Parliament constituency)
Thomas Knapp, governor of the Hudson's Bay Company (1746–1750)